Pawan Nagar is a town and Village Development Committee  in Dang District in Lumbini Province of south-western Nepal. At the time of the 1991 Nepal census it had a population of 11,428 persons living in 1961 individual households. Farming is the main occupation.

References

External links
UN map of the municipalities of Dang District

Populated places in Dang District, Nepal